Eunidia subannulicornis is a species of beetle in the family Cerambycidae. It was described by Stephan von Breuning in 1968.

Varietas
 Eunidia subannulicornis var. basinigricornis Breuning, 1971
 Eunidia subannulicornis var. subsimplicior Breuning, 1972

References

Eunidiini
Beetles described in 1968